K͟hadíjih-Sulțán Bagum (1822 – September 15, 1882) was the wife of the Báb. She is sometimes referred to as K͟hadíjih Bagum, K͟hadíjih Bigum or K͟hadíjih K͟hánum.

Biography

Background
The second daughter of her parents, Khadíjih Bagum was born with the name of K͟hadíjih-Sultán Shírází in 1822 in Shiraz. The appellation given to her Bagum ("Bagum" signifies "Lady") is seen as a sign of respect, and should not be mistaken for part of her name. Her father Áqá Mír ʻAlí was a merchant importing goods from Bushehr. He worked in the family's mercantile business and was the least successful member of the family. Her mother, Ḥájíyyih Bíbí of Jahrum, had been widowed when she married Khadíjih's father. From her mother's first marriage Khadíjih had one half brother named Muhammad-Mihdí, a noted poet, and a half sister known as ʻAmmih Ḥájí, who when grown married Hájí Mírzá Siyyid ʻAlí, the guardian of the Báb in his childhood. She had three full siblings: two brothers, Ḥájí Mírzá Abu'l-Qasim, who followed the family occupancy of commerce, Ḥájí Mírzá Siyyid Hasan, who became a teacher of medicine and studied theology, and one sister named Zahrá.

In childhood she was acquainted with the Báb, being his second cousin once removed, and the two were playmates. As the two grew older however, following custom, they did not see each other. In his young manhood the Báb went to go on pilgrimage to Karbila for long periods of time. This distressed his mother, causing her to search for something to keep the 23-year-old Báb in Shiraz – a wife. This resulted in the marriage of Khadíjih Bagum and the Báb, arranged swiftly, perhaps to dissuade him from leaving Shiraz.

Marriage life and developments

The 20-year-old Khadíjih Bagum married the Báb on August 25, 1842 in Shiraz, the ceremony being conducted by the imam of the city, Shaykh Abú-Turáb. The young couple moved into a modest compound with the Báb's mother, Fátimih Bagum. In 1843 she gave birth to the couple's only child, a boy named Ahmad, who died a few months later. Ahmad was buried in the vicinity of Bíbí-Dukhtarán in Shiraz, but his body was later removed. The birth was a difficult one, with the life of Khadíjih at stake, and she never conceived again. The death of her only child was very hard for her to bear, and the Báb consoled her, assuring her that their son was in heaven. She later recalled how the earliest days of her marriage were some of the happiest times of her life. Bagum was also the first to witness her husband's experience of what was claimed to be revelation early April, 1844, shortly before the declaration to Mulla Husayn. Following the sojourn of her husband to Isfahan for his safety she lived a lonely life with the mother of the Báb and her closest companion, an African servant named Fiddih. Anguished at separation from her husband, she consoled herself with letters he sent her, revealing a loving relationship the two had. News concerning the Báb reached her and Fátimih Bagum only sporadically. Family members were often resentful and embarrassed about connection to the Báb, and distanced themselves from Khadíjih, with only her sister Zahrá dressing herself as a peasant to come to tell her sister news of the Báb.

At the age of 28 Khadíjih was widowed when the Báb was killed by a firing squad. She then moved into the house of her sister Zahrá. Fearing for her health, the men of the household thought it prudent to keep the Báb's death a secret from her and his mother for almost a year. However, with the death of the uncle of the Báb, as well as his 18-year-old son, the secret could not be kept. The women were distraught and all three men were mourned together. The mother of the Báb was horrified, and decided to retire to Karbila. This departure meant that Khadíjih was dependent only on Fiddih and her sister. "Her departure from Shiraz added greatly to my burden of sorrow and deepened the sadness of my heart. I had no longer by my side a comforter whose love and sympathy and care had sustained me over the years," she remarked.

Later life

According to her own later account, she had recognized the Báb's religious station before the Báb had declared his mission to Mulla Husayn. She later recognized Baháʼu'lláh's claim, and became a Baháʼí. She kept in correspondence with Baháʼu'lláh while she had returned to Shiraz and lived in her previous home. She was greatly revered by the Baháʼís; many visited her whilst journeying to see Baháʼu'lláh. One occasion the very young Fátimih Nahrí of Isfahán, accompanied by her brother, visited. “They stayed for fifteen days, and those were some of the happiest days of my life” she later reflected.

Later she was to make a journey to 'Akká to visit Baháʼu'lláh in 1882 with her nephew who was to come from Yazd. However, when her nephew went straight to Ottoman Syria, she was not able to go, as women could not travel alone. After hearing the news, her health rapidly decreased. She died on September 15, 1882 at the age of sixty, and was buried in Shiraz. The same night her devoted maid and closest friend, an African named Fiddih, died too. In the Kitáb-i-Badíʻ, Baháʼu'lláh gives her the title of Khayru'n Nisa (The Most Virtuous of Women) and forbids all women, save Fátimih Bagum, the Báb's mother, from adopting the title.

See also
Ásiyih Khánum — Baháʼu'lláh's wife
Munirih Khánum — ʻAbdu'l-Bahá's wife

Notes

Citations

References

1822 births
1882 deaths
Bábís
Iranian Bahá'ís
19th-century Bahá'ís
People from Shiraz
19th-century Iranian women